Hamza Jelassi (born 29 September 1991) is a Tunisian footballer who plays as a midfielder for CS Sfaxien.

References

1991 births
Living people
Tunisian footballers
Tunisia international footballers
Jendouba Sport players
Olympique Béja players
Stade Gabèsien players
CA Bizertin players
CS Sfaxien players
Association football midfielders
Tunisian Ligue Professionnelle 1 players